Margaret Renwick, (February 1, 1923 – January 20, 2012) was a politician in Ontario, Canada. She was a New Democratic member of the Legislative Assembly of Ontario from 1967 to 1971 who represented the riding of Scarborough Centre.

Background
She was married to Jim Renwick, the MPP for Riverdale from 1964 to 1984. Together they raised one daughter.

Politics
Renwick ran in the 1967 provincial election as the NDP candidate in the riding of Scarborough Centre. She defeated Progressive Conservative incumbent George Peck by 898 votes. She joined her husband, Jim in the legislature to become the first husband and wife to serve together in the Ontario legislature. She was the party's critic for the Department of Social and Family Services. In 1970, she supported Stephen Lewis in his bid to become leader of the party.

In the 1971 election she was defeated by PC candidate Frank Drea by 4,873 votes.

In 1982, after the death of former premier, John Robarts, she praised his ability to rise above party politics. She recalled times when the legislature was in turmoil. She said, "He'd come in and listen. Then he'd rise and things would grow quiet as he'd speak. Then he'd put it all in perspective."

Later life
After leaving political office, Renwick moved to Streetsville, a neighbourhood in Mississauga, Ontario, where she was active on the Streetsville NDP Riding Association. She moved back to Toronto in 2008 and died at the Trillium Health Centre.

References

External links
 

1923 births
2012 deaths
Ontario New Democratic Party MPPs
Women MPPs in Ontario